is a Japanese racing driver, best known for winning the 2013 All-Japan Formula Three Championship.

Career

Karting
Born in Tokyo, Nakayama began his racing career in karting at the age of six and raced in various local championships, progressing to the KF2 category in 2007, finishing 7th in the Asia-Pacific Championship.

Early career
In 2008, Nakayama graduated to single–seaters into the Formula Challenge Japan mono-series. He finished thirteenth in the series standings, without scoring a podium. He stayed in the series for another season, progressing to fourth position in the standings, collecting six podiums.

He stayed in the series for a third successive season in 2010. He dominated the whole season and won ten from twelve races, finishing every race in the podium positions and finally took the championship title. He also contested the final rounds in Formula BMW Pacific, joining the Asia Racing Team.

All-Japan Formula Three
In 2011, Nakayama stepped up to the National class of the All-Japan Formula Three Championship with the TOM'S Spirit team. He finished third, taking three class wins.

In 2012 he switched to the series' Championship class, joining the main TOM'S team. He finished as runner-up to Ryō Hirakawa, winning races at Motegi, Sugo and Fuji. During the season he also appeared in the Macau Grand Prix, finishing 21st.

He continued his collaboration with TOM'S in 2013. This time he dominated the championship, finishing each of the 13 races he contested – 11 wins and a pair of runner-up placings – on the podium, clinching the championship title before the final round of the season, that he was forced to miss. He also repeated his effort to win the Macau Grand Prix trophy with TOM'S.

Super Formula
Nakayama made his début in Super Formula in 2014 with KCMG. He finished in eighteenth position in the championship standings, without scoring a point. Despite this, the team decided to retain him for the 2015 season.

Racing record

Career summary

†– As Nakayama was a guest driver, he was ineligible for points.
* Season still in progress.

‡ Team standings.

Complete Super Formula results
(Races in bold indicate pole position)

* Season still in progress.

Complete Super GT results
(key) (Races in bold indicate pole position) (Races in italics indicate fastest lap)

* Season still in progress.

References

External links
  
 

1991 births
Living people
Sportspeople from Tokyo
Japanese racing drivers
Formula BMW Pacific drivers
Japanese Formula 3 Championship drivers
Super Formula drivers
Super GT drivers
Formula Challenge Japan drivers
Toyota Gazoo Racing drivers
KCMG drivers
TOM'S drivers
Kondō Racing drivers
Asia Racing Team drivers
Team LeMans drivers
Nürburgring 24 Hours drivers